This is a list of selected species within the genus Eucera. It does not include species from the former genera Tetraloniella, Peponapis, Syntrichalonia, Cemolobus, Xenoglossodes or Xenoglossa.
 Eucera acerba (Cresson, 1879)
 Eucera actuosa (Cresson, 1878)
 Eucera aequata Vachal, 1907
 Eucera afghana Tkalcu, 1978
 Eucera albescens (Timberlake, 1969)
 Eucera alborufa (Radoszkowski, 1872)
 Eucera alfkeni Risch, 2003
 Eucera algeriensis Dalla Torre, 1896
 Eucera algira Brullé, 1840
 Eucera alopex Risch, 1999
 Eucera alternans (Brullé, 1832)
 Eucera amoena (Zavortink, 1982)
 Eucera amsinckiae (Timberlake, 1969)
 Eucera andreui (Dusmet y Alonso, 1926)
 Eucera angustifrons (Timberlake, 1969)
 Eucera arachosiae Tkalcu, 1978
 Eucera aragalli (Cockerell, 1904)
 Eucera argyrophila (Cockerell, 1909)
 Eucera armeniaca (Morawitz, 1878)
 Eucera atrata Klug, 1845
 Eucera atricornis Fabricius, 1793
 Eucera atriventris (Smith, 1854)
 Eucera atroalba (Pérez, 1895)
 Eucera bakeri (Timberlake, 1973)
 Eucera barbiventris Pérez, 1902
 Eucera basizona (Spinola, 1839)
 Eucera belfragei (Cresson, 1872)
 Eucera bidentata Pérez, 1887
 Eucera birkmanniella (Cockerell, 1906)
 Eucera biscrensis (Alfken, 1933)
 Eucera brevitarsis Risch, 1997
 Eucera caerulescens Friese, 1899
 Eucera californica (Cresson, 1878)
 Eucera carinata (Timberlake, 1961)
 Eucera carolinensis Dalla Torre, 1896
 Eucera caspica Morawitz, 1873
 Eucera cassandra Nurse, 1904
 Eucera cercidis (Timberlake, 1969)
 Eucera chinensis (Smith, 1854)
 Eucera chrysobotryae (Cockerell, 1908)
 Eucera chrysophila (Cockerell, 1914)
 Eucera chrysopyga Pérez, 1879
 Eucera cineraria Eversmann, 1852
 Eucera cinerea Lepeletier, 1841
 Eucera cinnamomea Alfken, 1935
 Eucera clypeata Erichson, 1835
 Eucera codinai Dusmet y Alonso, 1926
 Eucera collaris Dours, 1873
 Eucera commixta Dalla Torre & Friese, 1895
 Eucera conditi (Timberlake, 1969)
 Eucera conformis (Timberlake, 1969)
 Eucera cordleyi (Viereck, 1905)
 Eucera cuniculina Klug, 1845
 Eucera curvitarsis Mocsáry, 1879
 Eucera cypria Alfken, 1933
 Eucera dalmatica Lepeletier, 1841
 Eucera deceptrix Smith, 1879
 Eucera decipiens Alfken, 1935
 Eucera decolorata Gribodo, 1924
 Eucera delphinii (Timberlake, 1969)
 Eucera diana Nurse, 1904
 Eucera digitata Friese, 1896
 Eucera dimidiata Brullé, 1832
 Eucera discoidalis Morawitz, 1878
 Eucera distincta Lepeletier, 1841
 Eucera distinguenda (Morawitz, 1875)
 Eucera dorsata (Timberlake, 1969)
 Eucera douglasiana (Cockerell, 1906)
 Eucera doursana Dalla Torre & Friese, 1894
 Eucera dubitata (Cresson, 1878)
 Eucera ebmeri Risch, 1999
 Eucera edwardsii (Cresson, 1878)
 Eucera elongatula Vachal, 1907
 Eucera eucnemidea Dours, 1873
 Eucera excisa Mocsáry, 1879
 Eucera fasciata Risch, 1999
 Eucera fasciatella Lepeletier, 1841
 Eucera fedtschenkoi Dalla Torre, 1896
 Eucera ferghanica Morawitz, 1875
 Eucera ferruginea Lepeletier, 1841
 Eucera flavicornis Risch, 2003
 Eucera floralia (Smith, 1854)
 Eucera frater (Cresson, 1878)
 Eucera friesei Risch, 2003
 Eucera fulvitarsis (Cresson, 1878)
 Eucera fulviventris (Smith, 1854)
 Eucera fulvohirta (Cresson, 1878)
 Eucera furfurea Vachal, 1907
 Eucera gaullei Vachal, 1907
 Eucera genovefae Vachal, 1907
 Eucera gracilipes Pérez, 1895
 Eucera graeca Radoszkowski, 1876
 Eucera grandis (Fonscolombe, 1846)
 Eucera hamata (Bradley, 1942)
 Eucera helvola Klug, 1845
 Eucera hermoni Risch, 2003
 Eucera hirsuta Morawitz, 1875
 Eucera hirsutissima (Cockerell, 1916)
 Eucera hispaliensis Pérez, 1902
 Eucera hispana Lepeletier, 1841
 Eucera hungarica Friese, 1896
 Eucera hurdi (Timberlake, 1969)
 Eucera ignota (Timberlake, 1969)
 Eucera illinoensis (Robertson, 1902)
 Eucera interrupta Bär, 1850
 Eucera jacoti (Cockerell, 1930)
 Eucera kilikiae Risch, 1999
 Eucera kullenbergi Tkalcu, 1978
 Eucera kyrenaica Friese, 1923
 Eucera lanata Sitdikov, 1988
 Eucera lanuginosa Klug, 1845
 Eucera latipes Risch, 1997
 Eucera laxiscopa Alfken, 1935
 Eucera lepida (Cresson, 1878)
 Eucera longicornis (Linnaeus, 1758)
 Eucera lucasi (Gribodo, 1893)
 Eucera lunata (Timberlake, 1969)
 Eucera lutziana (Cockerell, 1933)
 Eucera lycii (Cockerell, 1897)
 Eucera maroccana (Dusmet y Alonso, 1928)
 Eucera mastrucata (Morawitz, 1875)
 Eucera matalae Tkalcu, 2003
 Eucera mauritaniae Tkalcu, 1984
 Eucera maxima Tkalcu, 1987
 Eucera mediterranea Friese, 1896
 Eucera melanocephala Morawitz, 1875
 Eucera metallescens (Morawitz, 1888)
 Eucera microsoma Cockerell, 1922
 Eucera minulla Risch, 2003
 Eucera mohavensis (Timberlake, 1969)
 Eucera monozona (Timberlake, 1969)
 Eucera monticola Risch, 2003
 Eucera moricei Alfken, 1935
 Eucera nigrescens Pérez, 1879
 Eucera nigrifacies Lepeletier, 1841
 Eucera nigrilabris Lepeletier, 1841
 Eucera nigripes Klug, 1845
 Eucera nigrita Friese, 1895
 Eucera nipponensis (Pérez, 1911)
 Eucera nitidiventris Mocsáry, 1879
 Eucera notata Lepeletier, 1841
 Eucera numida Lepeletier, 1841
 Eucera obliterata Pérez, 1896
 Eucera occidentalis Risch, 1999
 Eucera oraniensis Lepeletier, 1841
 Eucera oreophila Risch, 2003
 Eucera pagosana (Cockerell, 1925)
 Eucera palaestinae Friese, 1922
 Eucera pallidihirta (Timberlake, 1969)
 Eucera pannonica Mocsáry, 1878
 Eucera paraclypeata Sitdikov, 1988
 Eucera parnassia Pérez, 1902
 Eucera pedata Dours, 1873
 Eucera pekingensis Yasumatsu, 1946
 Eucera penicillata Risch, 1997
 Eucera phaceliae (Cockerell, 1911)
 Eucera pici Vachal, 1907
 Eucera pitalomasa (Dover, 1925)
 Eucera polita Pérez, 1895
 Eucera pollinaris (Kirby, 1802)
 Eucera pomeranzevii (Morawitz, 1888)
 Eucera pomona Nurse, 1904
 Eucera popovi Sitdikov, 1988
 Eucera primiveris (Timberlake, 1969)
 Eucera pseudeucnemidea Risch, 1997
 Eucera pulveracea Dours, 1873
 Eucera punctatissima Pérez, 1895
 Eucera puncticollis Morawitz, 1876
 Eucera punctissima de Gaulle, 1908
 Eucera punctulata Alfken, 1942
 Eucera pusilla Morawitz, 1875
 Eucera pythagoras Risch, 2003
 Eucera quadricincta (Timberlake, 1969)
 Eucera quilisi (Dusmet y Alonso, 1926)
 Eucera rosae (Robertson, 1900)
 Eucera ruficollis (Brullé, 1832)
 Eucera rufipes Smith, 1879
 Eucera salamita Vachal, 1907
 Eucera seminuda Brullé, 1832
 Eucera serraticornis Risch, 1999
 Eucera sociabilis Smith, 1873
 Eucera sogdiana Morawitz, 1875
 Eucera spatulata Gribodo, 1893
 Eucera speciosa (Cresson, 1878)
 Eucera spectabilis (Morawitz, 1875)
 Eucera speculifer Pérez, 1911
 Eucera spinipes Risch, 2003
 Eucera spurcatipes Pérez, 1911
 Eucera squamosa Lepeletier, 1841
 Eucera stretchii (Cresson, 1878)
 Eucera suavis (Cresson, 1878)
 Eucera subrufa Lepeletier, 1841
 Eucera syriaca Dalla Torre, 1896
 Eucera taurica Morawitz, 1871
 Eucera tegularis Morawitz, 1875
 Eucera territella (Cockerell, 1909)
 Eucera texana (Timberlake, 1969)
 Eucera thoracica Spinola, 1839
 Eucera tibialis Morawitz, 1875
 Eucera transitoria (Morawitz, 1875)
 Eucera tricincta Erichson, 1835
 Eucera tricinctella (Timberlake, 1969)
 Eucera troglodytes Risch, 2003
 Eucera truttae (Cockerell, 1905)
 Eucera tuberculata (Fabricius, 1793)
 Eucera turcomannica (Morawitz, 1880)
 Eucera vachali Pérez, 1895
 Eucera velutina (Morawitz, 1873)
 Eucera venusta (Timberlake, 1961)
 Eucera vernalis (Morawitz, 1875)
 Eucera vicina (Morawitz, 1876)
 Eucera vidua Lepeletier, 1841
 Eucera virgata (Cockerell, 1905)
 Eucera vittulata Noskiewicz, 1934
 Eucera vulpes Brullé, 1832
 Eucera warnckei Risch, 1999
 Eucera yunnanensis (Wu, 2000)
 Eucera zeta Dalla Torre, 1896
 Eucera zonata (Timberlake, 1969)

Apinae
Bee genera
Eucera